Black-veined white may refer to
 Aporia crataegi, a butterfly endemic to Europe, temperate Asia, and Siberia
 Dixeia doxo, a butterfly endemic to central and eastern Africa

See also
 Brown-veined white
 Green-veined white

Animal common name disambiguation pages